Asian Paints Super Singer 7 is a 2019 Indian Tamil language Reality singing competition show, the seventh season of the Super Singer show, which aired on Star Vijay on every Saturday and Sunday at 20:00 (IST) starting from 27 April 2019.Asian Paints returned to sponsor the season for the second time.

The show was hosted by Ma Ka Pa Anand and Priyanka Deshpande once again. The Judges of the show were the popular playback singers P. Unnikrishnan, Anuradha Sriram, Shweta Mohan and Benny Dayal. Music Director Anirudh Ravichander was the Brand Ambassador of the season. The winner will be given a chance to sing in an Anirudh's musical on a feature film.

The finalists include Punya, Murugan, Vikram, Gowtham and Sam Vishal. The Grand Finale was held on 10 November 2019 at Codissia Trade Fair Complex, Coimbatore and it was live telecasted from 3:30pm onwards on Vijay TV. Murugan was declared as the winner. Vikram was second. Sam Vishal and Punya were tied for the third place. At the grand finale Anirudh announced that he will also be giving a chance to Sam Vishal and Punya to sing under his composition.

Hosts
Priyanka Deshpande
Ma Ka Pa Anand

Main Judges
Following four returned as Judge for the seventh season
 P. Unnikrishnan
 Anuradha Sriram
 Shweta Mohan
 Benny Dayal

Contestants
 Murugan aka Mookuthi Murugan (Anuradha and Unnikrishnan team) was declared the Winner of the Super Singer Season 7 and received a 50 lakh worth house by Arun Excello.
 Vikram (Anuradha and Unnikrishnan team) was the first runner up of the season and was awarded 25 lakh gold by Gold one.
 Sam Vishal (Anuradha and Unnikrishnan team) who got the highest number of public votes emerged as the second runner up of the season along with Punya (Shwetha and Benny team) who was getting the highest scores in all rounds of the season and even in the grand finale.
 Gowtham (Shwetha and Benny team) was the third runner up of the season. He was initially eliminated from the show at Top 5, he came back as a wild card contestant.

Main competition 
The main competition comprised a series of performance rounds on successive weeks, from 18 May 2019 to 22 September 2019, with occasional break weeks. Typically each round had two episodes telecasted on Saturday and Sunday, with 1 contestant who lost the battle with least marks from each of the two teams being nominated to the danger zone at the end of the last episode that week. The contestants in the danger zone are handed over to the public audience, where people vote for the contestant whom they wish to be continued in the show. Based on public votes one contestant with lesser votes gets eliminated in the first episode of each week. On few occasions, there were no nominations for danger zone. Each judge, based on the performances of the contestants give marks in a total of 10 points.

Duet Challenge 
Performances : This round required 2 contestants from each team to perform a single song.

Episodes : 07 & 08

Key

Battle

Solo Competition Round 
Performances : The contestants give ace performances and a tough fight in their first solo competitive performance.

Episodes : 09 & 10

Key

Battle

Devotional Songs Round 
Performances : It's an array of soulful performances by the talented contestants of the show where they sing Devotional songs.

Judges : Renowned singers T. L. Maharajan, Subha and Sowmya join the judging panel along with Anuradha, Unnikrishnan and Shweta Mohan on the special occasion

Episodes : 11 & 12

Key

Battle 

Asian Paints' Wall of Fame : Murugan

Get - Up Round 
Performances : The contestants dress-up themselves based on the songs chosen and compete with some spectacular performances.

Episodes : 13 & 14

Key

Battle

Best Performer & Wall of Fame : Roshini

Best Entertainer : Punya

The Performance Round 
Performances : The contestants put on a slew of energetic acts and take the battle to another level with their power-packed performances.

Episodes : 15 & 16

Key

Battle 

Best Performer & Wall of Fame : Punya

Best Entertainer : Gowtham

Pattanam vs Pattikada Round 
Performance : Pattanam vs Pattikada, a contestant from each team battles on a topic based on how it happens in a city and in a village and deliver their performance in the form of a song.

Episodes : 17 & 18

Key

Battle 

Best Performer & Wall of Fame : Roshini

Best Entertainer : Purnima

Latest Songs Round 
Performances : The contestants pick the latest Songs to perform and rule the floor with their rocking performances and amuse the audience with their vibrant acts.

Episodes : 19 & 20

Key

Battle 

Best Performer & Wall of Fame : Suganthi

Best Entertainer : Kannagi

Star Wars Round 
Performance : The contestants showcase their talents. The singing sensations of the previous seasons join the show to support the contestants and sing along with them.

Judges : Singers Kalpana, S. P. Charan and K. S. Chithra joined the judging panel along with Anuradha, Unnikrishnan and Shweta Mohan for the Star Wars Round.

Episodes : 21 & 22

Key

Battle

Best Performer & Wall of Fame : Sivaangi

Best Entertainer : Punya

The Folk Songs Round 
Performances : The contestants bring on festive vibes and leave the audience in splits with their traditional performances. Contestants scoring 58 and above out of 60 gets a chance to choose their opponent in the upcoming Big Battle Round.

Judges : Singers Mano, Subha and Anthony Daasan join the judging panel along with Anuradha, Unnikrishnan and Shweta Mohan.

Episodes : 23 & 24

Key

Battle

Best Performer & Wall of Fame : Murugan

Best Entertainer : Roshini

The Big Battle Round 
Performances : The young talents take the competition to another level with some breathtaking performances and bring the house down with some energetic performances.

Roshini, Kannagi and Murugan battle with their chosen opponents Sam Vishal, Vaisakhan and Punya respectively.

Episodes :  25 & 26

Key

Battle 

Best Performer & Wall of Fame : Vikram

Best Entertainer : Murugan and Punya

The Anirudh Special Round 
Performances : Music Director Anirudh Ravichander joins the show. The contestants along with musician Stephen Devassy perform songs composed by Anirudh.

Episodes : 27 & 28

Key

Battle 

Best Performer & Wall of Fame : Mufeeda

Best Entertainer : Suganthi

Anirudh selects Punya who goes into the Top 10 Round as a direct Top 10 contestant.

Masala Padam Round 
Performances : Contestants battle on songs that are required for a Masala film.

Episodes : 29 & 30

Key

Battle 

Best Performer & Wall of Fame : Vikram

Best Entertainer : Gowtham

Top 10 Selection with Vijay Stars 
Performances : The Vijay Stars accompany the contestants and give a dance performance. The contestants face each other in a singing battle to reach the Top 10 spots.

Episodes : 31 & 32

Key

Battle 

Best Performer & Wall of Fame : Sivaangi

Best Entertainer : Sam Vishal

Top 10 Celebration-Boys vs Girls Round 
Performances : The participants split into 2 different teams and take up challenges. Super Singer Stars join the Celebration round to support the boys and girls.

Judge :Anuradha Sriram and Shweta Mohan supported the Girls team while Benny Dayal and P. Unnikrishnan supported the Boys team. The winner of the battle was declared by the audience present on the sets.

Episodes : 33 & 34

Key

Battle 

Best Performer : Punya and Nithyashree

Best Entertainer : Vaisakhan

Fusion Round With Rajesh Vaidhya 
Performances : The participants of the Fusion round showcase their talents and captivate the audience with their performances along with musician Rajhesh Vaidhya in the presence of popular singer Shankar Mahadevan.

Episodes : 35 & 36

Key

Battle

Best Performer & Wall of Fame : Vikram

Best Entertainer : Sivaangi

Romance Round 
Performances : The participants put on a slew of blissful performances and stun the audience with their mesmerizing performances

Episodes : 37 & 38

Key

Battle 

Best Performer & Wall of Fame : Vikram

Best Entertainer : Sivaangi

Cinema Cinema Round 
Performances : The KPY Champions illuminate the stage with their performances where they spoof movies, while the participants give a grand musical feast.

Episodes : 39 & 40

Key

Battle

Best Performer & Wall of Fame : Vaisakhan

Best Entertainer : Punya

The Final Fight 
Performances : The teams get ready for their final fight as this the last week, the contestants battle as 2 different teams. There are 2 rounds, where 1 contestant from each team come together to battle on a song.

Key

Episode : 41

Round 1 

Episode : 42

Round 2 

Best Performer & Wall of Fame : Vikram

Best Entertainer : Gowtham

The Hero Heroine Round 
Performances : The young singers come up as real heroes and heroines to present a vibrant feast of music. The contestants battle as individuals and not as a team. Top 3 contestants selected by the judges go into the Top 6 directly. The remaining 4 contestants have a one-on-one battle, in which 2 of them get selected for the Top 6, while the remaining 2 go into the danger zone.

Episode : 41 & 42

Round 1 

Best Performer & Wall of Fame : Murugan

Best Entertainer : Sam Vishal

Top 3 Contestants

1. Murugan

2. Punya

3. Sam Vishal

Round 2

Key

Finals

Quarter Finals- Sing With The Judges Round 
There are 2 rounds in which the 6 contestants sing with one of the judges Benny Dayal and Shweta Mohan in each round. Contestants scoring marks 75 and above out of 80 go into the Semi-Finals directly.

Round 1

Episode : 45

Round 2

Episode : 46

Top 5 Celebration 
The participants enthrall the audience with their fantastic folk performances. It is the celebration with the top 5 contestants of the season.

Episode : 47

References

External links
Super Singer 7 on Hotstar
 

Star Vijay original programming
2019 Tamil-language television series debuts
2019 Tamil-language television seasons
Tamil-language singing talent shows
Tamil-language reality television series
Tamil-language television shows
2019 Tamil-language television series endings
Television shows set in Tamil Nadu
Airtel Super Singer seasons